None So Blind is a 1923 American silent drama film directed by Burton L. King and written by Leota Morgan and Kathleen Kerrigan.  The film stars Dore Davidson, Zena Keefe, and Anders Randolph.

Cast list

References

1923 films
1920s English-language films
1923 drama films
American silent feature films
American black-and-white films
Films directed by Burton L. King
Arrow Film Corporation films
1920s American films